Pentapadu is a village in West Godavari district of the Indian state of Andhra Pradesh.

Demographics 

 Census of India, Pentapadu had a population of 12889. The total population constitute, 6377 males and 6512 females with a sex ratio of 1021 females per 1000 males. 1273 children are in the age group of 0–6 years, with sex ratio of 958 The average literacy rate stands at 75.35%.

This was the birthplace of Actress Pushpavalli, the mother of Bollywood star Rekha

References 

Villages in West Godavari district